Gymnopilus hypholomoides is a species of mushroom in the family Hymenogastraceae.

See also

List of Gymnopilus species

External links
Gymnopilus hypholomoides at Index Fungorum

hypholomoides
Taxa named by William Alphonso Murrill